is a 2013 film adaptation of the Japanese Super Sentai television series Zyuden Sentai Kyoryuger. It was released on August 3, 2013, as a double-bill with the Kamen Rider Series film Kamen Rider Wizard in Magic Land. The film guest stars gravure idol Shizuka Nakamura as a supporting role. Gaburincho of Music is a musical.

Story
The Kyoryugers attend the show by pop star Meeko, a girl from Daigo's past. But when a group of Zorima led by two girls raids the area, the Kyoryugers hold off the Dino Girls while Kyoryu Red gets Meeko to safety. However, as the latter she lost her pendant, Daigo and Meeko encounter a former Deboth Army member named D who gained the power to become Deathryuger while confirming the girl to be the one he is looking for. Even with the Kyoryugers gathered, Deathryuger overpowers them all before taking Meeko. The Kyoryugers learn from Torin that D seeks to revive the first Zyudenryu Tobaspino before they are alerted to Tobaspino's reawakening with their Zyudenryu powerless. Though Ankydon and Bunpachy attempt to help, they end up being forcefully merged with Tobaspino to create SpinoDaiOh which proceeds to ready the Great Eradication Blast. As the others make their way to him, Utsusemimaru halts Deathryuger's preparations with Pteraigordon. When asked why they would, the Kyoryugers start before they transform and proceed to fight D's forces. After a motorcycle duel, a wounded Deathryuger retreats back into Tobaspino as Raiden Kyoryuzin is formed and manages to make a dent. However, after he infiltrates SpinoDaiOh, Daigo is beaten to a bloody pulp by D after he discards his Deathryuger helmet. However, seeing the pendant Daigo brought with him, Meeko sings 'Dino Soul' which restores SpinoDaiOh's mind as it acts to stop the Eradication Blast. With the Gaburu Armed On Gabutyra Zyudenchi, Kyoryu Red uses two Gabutyra Fangs to knock D out of SpinoDaiOh with the villain falling his death. Saved by Raiden Kyoryuzin, the others convince him not to give up as they join Meeko's singing to purify SpinoDaiOh as they destroy the Eradication Blast. Entrusted with the Tobaspino Zyudenchi, Meeko while the Kyoryugers get a backstage pass while Topaspino returns to its resting place.

Cast
: 
: 
: 
: 
: 
: 
: 
: 
: 
: 
: 
: 
: 
: 
: 
/: 
Narration, Kyoryuger Equipment Voice:

Music
Gaburincho of Music is a musical and features various songs by the cast as well as other pieces from the series' soundtrack. A "song album" film theme song single were released on July 31, 2013.

Theme song
"GABURINCHO OF MUSIC!"
Lyrics & Composition: Hideaki Takatori
Arrangement: Hiroaki Kagoshima
Artist: Hideaki Takatori, Showgo Kamata, & Kyoryugers

Insert songs

Lyrics: Shoko Fujibayashi
Composition: Yusuke Mochida
Arrangement: Kousuke Yamashita
Artist: Showgo Kamata
"Dino Soul"
Lyrics: Riku Sanjo
Composition & Arrangement: Go Sakebe
Artist: Meeko (Shizuka Nakamura)

Lyrics: Natsumi Tadano
Composition: Kei Haneoka
Arrangement: Seiki Sato
Artist: Daiki Ise

Lyrics: Natsumi Tadano
Composition & Arrangement: Go Sakebe
Artist: Kimeru

Lyrics: Natsumi Tadano
Composition & Arrangement: Go Sakebe
Artist: Canderrilla, Aigallon, Luckyulo (Haruka Tomatsu, Yū Mizushima, Ai Orikasa)

Lyrics: Riku Sanjo
Composition & Arrangement: Go Sakebe
Artist: Mikoto Amano (Shizuka Nakamura)

References

External links

2010s Super Sentai films
2013 films
Films scored by Toshihiko Sahashi